VA-21A was an Attack Squadron of the U.S. Navy during World War II. It was established as Bombing Squadron VB-98 on 28 August 1944 and redesignated as VA-21A on 15 November 1946. The squadron was disestablished on 5 August 1947.

The squadron's mission was to provide a pool of trained dive-bomber pilots and aircrewmen for assignment as replacements to squadrons operating in the Pacific. The training practiced in the squadron included carrier landing qualifications, gunnery, bombing and night flying.

Aircraft assignment
The squadron was assigned the following aircraft in the months shown:
 SB2C-3 - Sep 1944
 SBD-6 - Sep 1944
 SB2C-4 - Oct 1944
 FM-2 - Oct 1944
 SBD-5 - Nov 1944
 SBW-3 - Dec 1944
 SBW-4E - Mar 1945
 SB2C-5 - Apr 1945

See also
 Attack aircraft
 History of the United States Navy
 List of inactive United States Navy aircraft squadrons

References

Attack squadrons of the United States Navy
Wikipedia articles incorporating text from the Dictionary of American Naval Aviation Squadrons